PlayMania was a live interactive game show on GSN, hosted by Mel Peachey, Shandi Finnessey, Jessica York, Angelle Tymon, and Jeff Thisted. The two-hour program featured interactive games that the viewers could play to win cash prizes. On February 20, 2007, the show was replaced with two separate programs, quiznation and 100 Winners which were collectively known as the PlayMania Block.

Format
The original PlayMania was a game show in which home viewers were the contestants. American residents 18 or older could enter the contest by text messaging for a small fee, or using the network's website to enter free. From January to April 2007 a premium-rate phone number was available to use as an entry method, as well.
Within a few moments, a contestant was notified whether or not his or her entry had been chosen (at random) to proceed to another random selection process. If an entry was selected in the second phase, the contestant would then be called on his or her home or mobile phone, depending on which method of entry had been used. The contestant would then, if the game was still in progress, play on-air. After a game was completed, the queue was cleared, and any entrants who wished to play the next game were required to re-enter. A $.99 fee applied for each text message entry or premium rate phone call, along with standard text messaging rates added to the former. Entries on the network's website were free. Regardless of the method of entry, each entry had an equal chance of being selected. An entry did not necessarily guarantee an opportunity to appear on the show. Residents of certain states were ineligible to play using various entry methods.

The PlayMania Block shows continued to use the same entry process.

Programming history
The original format of PlayMania was based on Quiznation, a British television channel produced by Optimistic Entertainment. Optimistic was also co-producer of the U.S. PlayMania, and Mel Peachey, one of the hosts of Quiznation, was brought over to host the U.S. version. After the division of PlayMania into two separate programs, the Quiznation name would be used in the U.S., as well. PlayMania originally was scheduled to air three days a week in April 2006, from 1–3 AM (Eastern Time); a Sunday broadcast was added on August 27, and Tuesday and Wednesday editions were added on October 3 and October 4 of that year. The airtime of the show changed to 12 midnight–2 AM (ET) beginning with the August 24, 2006 episode.

On February 20, 2007, PlayMania was divided into two separate programs. Collectively, these shows, quiznation and 100 Winners, became known as "the PlayMania Block." While 100 Winners presented a format novel to American viewers, the quiznation program shared games and a similar format with the original PlayMania. 

By June 14, 2007, all scheduled airings of 100 Winners had been replaced with quiznation episodes. The show is considered indefinitely canceled from the programming schedule, and is no longer referenced in the official rules described on the GSN website.  The same month 100 Winners was canceled, Optimistic Entertainment, the co-producer of PlayMania Block, went into administration. It is unknown what impact, if any, this had on the PlayMania Block.

On June 26, 2007, PlayMania gave away its one millionth dollar. The winning contestant, Bernice, received a $500 bonus in addition to the $400 she had won playing, as well as a personalized plaque commemorating the achievement.

On July 17, 2007, the Tuesday edition of quiznation ceased airing. After September 2, 2007, the Sunday broadcast was removed as well, slightly over a year after it originally debuted.

quiznation aired its last episode on October 31, 2007. The network had made claims that it was improving upon its interactive participation for new concepts in the future, which came about with the premiere of GSN Live on February 25, 2008.

Hosts and guest hosts
The debut episodes of PlayMania were hosted by Mel Peachey, a host of the U.K. edition of Quiznation, and Shandi Finnessey, a co-host of the GSN game show Lingo. Peachey was originally scheduled to appear on US airwaves for only one month in order to introduce America to the unfamiliar "participation TV" format. However, she stayed through the entire run of PlayMania and hosted the two "PlayMania Block" shows, as well. Finnessey and Peachey were joined by host Jessica York on October 19, 2006. Peachey returned to England after hosting quiznation on April 7, 2007, her "goodbye show". Finnessey and York continued to appear on quiznation. After a week of eliminations, Angelle Tymon was introduced as Peachey's replacement on the "PlayMania Block" on April 21, 2007. A month later, the May 18 edition of quiznation featured the debut of The Price is Right production coordinator Jeff Thisted as host.

In addition to the "official" hosts listed above, there have been several fill-in and guest hosts during PlayMania'''s run. Hannah Peckham hosted the June 15 and June 16 episodes in 2006, but did not become a permanent host. On two occasions, regulars from I've Got a Secret served as guest co-hosts in charge of viewer e-mail. Comedian Jermaine Taylor appeared on June 17, 2006, and Bil Dwyer appeared on June 22 of that year.

The PlayMania week of August 24, 2006, which featured a timeslot shift and the debut of a Sunday broadcast, was a "Winner's Weekend." This week featured puzzles about television to honor the 58th Annual Primetime Emmy Awards. As part of the theme, PlayMania held its own award ceremony, the "PlayMes", a parody of the Emmy Awards on the Sunday August 27 broadcast. Danny Bonaduce, then host of GSN's original game show Starface, appeared to present the awards. On that same night, $2,000 was given away to a caller named Julie, making her, at that time, the biggest PlayMania winner ever. (That record was later broken. The final record was set on the September 5, 2007 episode of quiznation by a caller named Teresa who won $4,700.)

GamesPlayMania featured various mini-games that were played throughout the program. The rewards for the games were usually cash prizes ranging from $100–$500 in cash, sometimes reaching amounts as high as $2,000. Any games that were not completed before the end of a day's broadcast are normally carried over to the start of the next show.

During its ten-month run, the below twenty-one permanent games were played on the original PlayMania. Many carried over to be rotated on quiznation.

Special games
For a special occasion or promotional opportunity, PlayMania often engaged in special, personalized games. Some of these included the celebration of Mother's Day, the release of Horrorfest and even a Super Match-esque style game for the documentary, The Match Game Story: Behind the Blank .

Other features
During its original tenure (and carrying over to quiznation afterward), PlayMania involved a second interactive feature, e-mail. When new e-mail arrived, the active host was alerted via a sound effect. The host then walked over to the large plasma-screen monitor on the set and read e-mails from viewers while taking a break from talking to the audience during games. Since July 13, 2006, each episode has had a requested theme for e-mails. The tone of the e-mails varies widely, from serious to silly. The host may showcase graphics that viewers have sent with e-mails, including photographs and viewer-created art.

There were featured sponsors for a number of PlayMania episodes, usually during the first hour only. On some occasions — for instance, during the first month of the show when the main sponsor was Dick's Sporting Goods — items provided by the sponsor were given away in addition to or instead of cash prizes.

PlayMania BlockPlayMania began to offer "new ways to play" on February 20, 2007. PlayMania expanded into the PlayMania Block, two separate shows under the PlayMania banner: 100 Winners and quiznation.

quiznation

Borrowing the title from its British predecessor, quiznation featured trivia, number, and word games with set cash prizes. The program aired from 12 midnight - 2 AM (EST) every Thursday through Saturday night (early Friday through early Sunday morning in the Eastern Time zone), but with the cancellation of 100 Winners, its final schedule was set at Wednesday through Saturday (technically early Thursday through early Sunday morning in the Eastern Time zone) quiznation's format was nearly identical to that of the PlayMania program. Its final episode was aired on October 31, 2007.

100 Winners100 Winners offered a contestant the chance to answer the on-screen game. If he or she answered correctly, he or she then chose one of one hundred safe deposit boxes on the set with a prize inside. The program aired from 12 midnight - 2 AM Eastern every Tuesday, Wednesday, and Sunday night (technically early Wednesday, Thursday, and Monday morning in the Eastern Time zone). Its final episode was aired on June 13, 2007.

See also
 Midnight Money Madness Take the Cake''
 Quiz channel

References

External links
 
 

Phone-in quiz shows
Game Show Network original programming
2000s American game shows
2006 American television series debuts
2007 American television series endings